Francis Burt Alberts (born May 4, 1950) is an American former professional baseball designated hitter, who played for the Toronto Blue Jays of Major League Baseball (MLB) in 1978.

Biography
Alberts was born in Williamsport, Pennsylvania, United States. He graduated from Gettysburg High School in Gettysburg, Pennsylvania in 1968, and was selected to play the Big 33 Football Classic as a wide receiver. Following high school, he played football and baseball at the University of Cincinnati.

He was the 28th round pick in the 1972 amateur draft of the Pittsburgh Pirates.

His only major league appearances occurred with the Toronto Blue Jays in 1978. He appeared in six games for the Blue Jays, hitting .278 for his career. He was later traded to the California Angels, but did not appear in any major league games with them.

References

External links 

The Baseball Page.com
Baseball Almanac

1950 births
American expatriate baseball players in Canada
Baseball players from Pennsylvania
Toronto Blue Jays players
Indianapolis Indians players
Salt Lake City Gulls players
Quad Cities Angels players
Cincinnati Bearcats baseball players
El Paso Diablos players
Salinas Packers players
Niagara Falls Pirates players
Richmond Braves players
Syracuse Chiefs players
Charleston Pirates players
Salem Pirates players
Sportspeople from Williamsport, Pennsylvania
Living people